Bukowa may refer to:

Places
Bukowa, Łódź Voivodeship (central Poland)
Bukowa, Lublin Voivodeship (east Poland)
Bukowa, Subcarpathian Voivodeship (south-east Poland)
Bukowa, Staszów County in Świętokrzyskie Voivodeship (south-central Poland)
Bukowa, Włoszczowa County in Świętokrzyskie Voivodeship (south-central Poland)
Bukowa, Pomeranian Voivodeship (north Poland)

Rivers
Bukowa (Bug), left tributary of the Bug River
Bukowa (Oder), left tributary of the West Oder
Bukowa (Parsęta), tributary of the Parsęta
Bukowa (San), left tributary of the San